"Pen & Paper", otherwise known as "Pen & Paper (Something Typical)", is the second single released from The Red Jumpsuit Apparatus' second album, Lonely Road. The song charted at #75 on the Billboard Hot 100. In the music video of the song Ronnie Winter describes the song as "Taking someone in your life that's fake and removing them".

2009 singles
The Red Jumpsuit Apparatus songs
2008 songs
Virgin Records singles